The New Zealand Superannuation Fund is a sovereign wealth fund in New Zealand. New Zealand currently provides universal superannuation for people over 65 years of age and the purpose of the Fund is to partially pre-fund the future cost of the New Zealand Superannuation pension, which is expected to increase as a result of New Zealand's ageing population. The fund is a member of the International Forum of Sovereign Wealth Funds and is therefore signed up to the Santiago Principles on best practice in managing sovereign wealth funds.

Foundation
The Superannuation Fund was created by the New Zealand Superannuation and Retirement Act 2001 on 11 October 2001 by Michael Cullen, who was then Minister of Finance under the Fifth Labour Government, and is colloquially known as the "Cullen Fund".

The sovereign fund posted a record 25.8% return in the twelve months till 30 June 2013. In the 2009 New Zealand budget the National Government suspended payments to the fund. Contributions were proposed to resume in 2020/21 when the Government's net debt to GDP was forecast to fall below 20% again. Instead, the new Labour-led government started payments into the superfund again in December 2017. The New Zealand Government had contributed $21.8 b to the fund as at 31 March 2022.

NZ Super Fund announced a preferred partner agreement with the Māori Investment Fund in March 2018.

Investments 
A full list of investments for current and previous years can be seen at the Annual Equity Listing page at the NZ Super Fund's website.

LanzaTech 
The Fund invested US$60 million into Chicago based LanzaTech in December 2014. On March 8, 2022, LanzaTech announced its initial public offering through a special-purpose acquisition company in a deal that valued the company at $2.2 billion.

View | Dynamic Glass 
During August 2015, The New Zealand Superannuation invested US$75 million into American-based electrochromic glass company View with a percentage owned not being released.

Kaingaroa Timberlands Partnership 
On Feb, 28th 2014, The Fund sold 2.5% of its stake in the Kaingaroa Timberlands Partnership to the Kakano Investment Limited Partnership, reducing its share from 41.25% to a 38.75% stake in the Kaingaroa partnership.

Other Investments
Other investments include a 7,943,351 share (0.71%) stake in partially state-owned and controlled (51.95% - state-owned portion) company Air New Zealand. The Super Fund also holds a 37.59% stake in Datacom Group. The Fund occasionally cooperates with outside companies to develop projects.

Exclusions

The Superfund maintains a list of excluded companies similar to the Government Pension Fund of Norway. The Superfund will not invest in the companies within the list.

The list includes,
 Companies in the tobacco industry; 
 Companies involved in the production of nuclear weapons, cluster munitions and anti-personnel mines; 
 Companies involved in the Grasberg mine in West Papua; 
 Companies involved in the processing of whale meat;
 Tokyo Electric Power Company;
 Companies involved in developing settlements in the Israeli-occupied territories;
 Companies involved in the manufacture of civilian automatic and semi-automatic firearms.

Controversies

Banco Espirito Santo
In February 2015 the Superfund wrote off a $150 million loss in a Goldman Sachs organised loan to the Portuguese Banco Espirito Santo. The loss represented 0.7% of the total value of the Superfund's investment portfolio at that time. Managers of the Superfund appeared before Parliament's commerce select committee on 26 February 2015 where they confirmed that legal action had been commenced against the Bank of Portugal to recover the lost money.

Divestment
The Superfund's investment portfolio is the subject of ongoing debate. Labour Party MP David Shearer called in August 2014 for divestment from a company manufacturing white phosphorus which is used by the Israeli Defence Force as a weapon.

In February 2015 Green Party MP Russel Norman called for the Superfund to divest $676 million from fossil fuel companies.

In August 2017 the Superfund quit or reduced holdings in 300 fossil fuel companies, making 40% of all Superfund investments carbon neutral. Companies include: ExxonMobil, Anadarko, Shell, BP, Statoil, New Zealand Oil & Gas, Genesis Energy, Alliant Energy, Berkshire Hathaway, Chevron, Rio Tinto, ConocoPhillips, Mitsubishi and Occidental Petroleum. Chief investment officer Matt Whineray stated, "We think that climate change represents a material risk, one that is not being properly priced by the markets."

Fossil fuel divestment campaign organisation 350.org Aotearoa had been campaigning for the New Zealand Superfund to divest from fossil fuels for one year. 350 Aotearoa and Greenpeace Aotearoa New Zealand supported the decision, calling it a "turning point for New Zealand."

References

External links

New Zealand Superannuation and Retirement Income Act 2001 on the New Zealand Legislation website.

Government of New Zealand
Sovereign wealth funds
Retirement in New Zealand
Government finances in New Zealand
Helen Clark